The Ellis County Courthouse on the Town Square in Arnett, Oklahoma was built in 1912.  It was listed on the National Register of Historic Places in 1985.

It was designed by New York City architect P. H. Weathers.

It is a brick courthouse which was originally two stories with a hipped roof.  The roof was removed in the 1930s and a third floor was added to serve as the county jail.

It was important historically as settling a county seat war.

References

External links

Courthouses in Oklahoma
National Register of Historic Places in Ellis County, Oklahoma
Government buildings completed in 1912